Montréal/Île Sainte-Hélène Water Airport or Hydro-Aéroport Montréal Centre-Ville, formerly , was located on the Saint Lawrence River adjacent to Saint Helen's Island near Montreal, Quebec, Canada. It was classified as an airport by Nav Canada and was subject to regular inspections by Transport Canada.

See also
 List of airports in the Montreal area

References

Defunct seaplane bases in Quebec